Kahlenberg is German surname. Notable people with the surname include: 

Ingeborg Kahlenberg (1920–1996), Dutch photographer and resistance fighter
Louis Kahlenberg (1870–1941), American chemist
Richard Kahlenberg (born 1963), American writer

German-language surnames